Tasuj District, formerly Anzab District, is in Shabestar County, East Azerbaijan province, Iran. At the 2006 National Census, its population was 18,708 in 5,440 households. The following census in 2011 counted 18,046 people in 5,736 households. At the latest census in 2016, the district had 18,842 inhabitants in 6,458 households.

References 

Shabestar County

Districts of East Azerbaijan Province

Populated places in East Azerbaijan Province

Populated places in Shabestar County